Anarmodia flaccidalis is a moth in the family Crambidae. It was described by Snellen in 1892. It is found in Peru.

References

Moths described in 1892
Spilomelinae
Moths of South America